In geometry, the tritetragonal tiling or alternated octagonal tiling is a uniform tiling of the hyperbolic plane. It has Schläfli symbols of {(4,3,3)} or h{8,3}.

Geometry 
Although a sequence of edges seem to represent straight lines (projected into curves), careful attention will show they are not straight, as can be seen by looking at it from different projective centers.

Dual tiling

In art 
Circle Limit III is a woodcut made in 1959 by Dutch artist M. C. Escher, in which "strings of fish shoot up like rockets from infinitely far away" and then "fall back again whence they came". White curves within the figure, through the middle of each line of fish, divide the plane into squares and triangles in the pattern of the tritetragonal tiling. However, in the tritetragonal tiling, the corresponding curves are chains of hyperbolic line segments, with a slight angle at each vertex, while in Escher's woodcut they appear to be smooth hypercycles.

Related polyhedra and tiling

See also
Circle Limit III
Square tiling
Uniform tilings in hyperbolic plane
List of regular polytopes

References
 John H. Conway, Heidi Burgiel, Chaim Goodman-Strass, The Symmetries of Things 2008,  (Chapter 19, The Hyperbolic Archimedean Tessellations)

External links 

 Douglas Dunham Department of Computer Science University of Minnesota, Duluth
 Examples Based on Circle Limits III and IV, 2006:More “Circle Limit III” Patterns, 2007:A “Circle Limit III” Calculation, 2008:A “Circle Limit III” Backbone Arc Formula

 Hyperbolic and Spherical Tiling Gallery
 KaleidoTile 3: Educational software to create spherical, planar and hyperbolic tilings
 Hyperbolic Planar Tessellations, Don Hatch

Hyperbolic tilings
Isogonal tilings
Uniform tilings
Octagonal tilings